Sundar Narayana Rao (born: 30 January) is an Indian singer. He mainly sings in the Tamil and Telugu languages.

Early life
Sundar Narayana Rao was born and brought up in Tamil Nadu. He was initiated into music at a very young age and was exposed to many forms of music. His learning and exploration took a drastic turn when he was exposed to Amir Khan (singer)’s cassette during his engineering days. It was at this time, he strongly felt he was more inclined towards the system of Hindustani classical music and started to deepen his learning harder. He learnt from several people initially before becoming the disciple of Pandit Madhav Bhatki of Gwalior Gharana, with whom he learnt for many years in New Jersey . Seeing his ardent potential, Pandit Madhav Bhatki developed his vigorous tayyari exclusively for many years and put him to practice for 10 to 12 hrs a day. His quest for learning all forms of music expanded his horizon towards Pakistani classical music, Afghani classical music, Punjabi classical music, Sufiana and multiple semi classical forms of Indian subgenres from the respective exponents of each systems during his many years of USA tenure...

Career
During his long stay in USA, he was associated with many North-American composers to do many non-film sound tracks and film sound tracks in multiple languages. Around early 2006, He relocated to India to pursue North Indian classical music in a mainstream capacity and with some of his friends making connections with film composers, he was forayed into film music. His diversified musical profile drew attention on Ghibran, who then launched him with Kuru Kuru and Kanna Kanna from the same movie, "vathikuchi".

As playback singer

Notable Tamil songs

Discography
 Vathikuchi—"Kuru Kuru" is the song that first gave him fame and even in the same movie he sang another song "Kanna Kanna". These two songs bring him accolades from all music lovers.

References

Sources
 Sundar in Raaga
 Best Songs of Sundar
 Sundar - SpicyOnion
 Sundar - Current Affairs
 Vathikuchi Music Review in Milliblog
 Vathikuchi Music Review in behindwoods
 Vathikuchi Music Review in Indiaglitz
 Sundar Interview in Outlook India

Indian male playback singers
Living people
Singers from Chennai
Tamil musicians
Tamil playback singers
Year of birth missing (living people)